This is the list of tourist attractions in Kedah, Malaysia.

Galleries
 Kedah State Art Gallery
 Sultan Abdul Halim Mu'adzam Shah Gallery

Historical sites
 Bujang Valley
 Balai Nobat

Mausoleums
 Kedah Royal Mausoleum

Museums
 Paddy Museum

Nature
 Langkawi Island
 Langkawi Legend Park
 Mount Jerai
 Pedu Lake

Religious places

Mosque
 Kedah State Mosque

Temple
 Wat Nikrodharam, Alor Setar

Sport centres
 Darul Aman Stadium
 Langkawi Stadium

Shopping centres
 City Plaza Alor Setar
 Pekan Rabu

Towers
 Kedah Tower
 Langkawi Tower

Transportation
 Langkawi Cable Car
 Langkawi Sky Bridge

Festivals
 Langkawi International Maritime and Aerospace Exhibition

See also
 List of tourist attractions in Malaysia

References

 
Tourism in Malaysia
Kedah